Super Junior is a South Korean  boy band which was formed in 2005 by the label SM Entertainment. They debuted under the name Super Junior 05 and was originally meant to be a band with rotational line-ups. Originally consist of twelve members; Leeteuk, Heechul, Han Geng, Yesung, Kangin, Shindong, Siwon, Sungmin, Eunhyuk, Donghae, Kibum and Ryeowook, the band changed its name permanently to Super Junior after the addition of final member Kyuhyun in 2006. As a large band, they uses the concept "separately and together" in their musical activities by forming subgroups which focuses on different genres; Super Junior-K.R.Y. which focuses on Korean ballad in 2006, Super Junior-T in 2007, Super Junior-Happy in 2008, Super Junior-M with two unit-exclusive members Henry and Zhou Mi in 2008, and Super Junior-D&E in 2011. The band also performed in the musical assemble SM Town, which consists of signed artists under SM Entertainment. As of 2021, the band has nine active members.

They, as a full group has recorded materials in Korean, Japanese, Chinese and Spanish for their eleven studio albums. They had further released four studio albums under their subunits; Me (2008) and Break Down (2013) as Super Junior-M, and Ride Me (2014) and Style (2018) as Super Junior-D&E. Some of their earlier work, namely their first album, Twins (2005), the collaboration single with labelmate TVXQ, "Show Me Your Love" (2005) and their first single album, U, were  released under the name Super Junior 05. The band's first seven Korean albums; Twins (2005), Don't Don (2008), Sorry, Sorry (2009), Bonamana (2010), Mr. Simple (2011), Sexy, Free & Single (2012), Mamacita (2014), and the compilation album Devil (2015) were released under the label SM Entertainment and produced by Lee Soo-man, while their sole Japanese album, Hero (2013) was released under Avex Trax in Japan.

On the band's 10th anniversary in 2015, the band's management were moved to the subsidiary label Label SJ. However, they did not release any material with the new management before going on hiatus in 2016 and most of 2017 due to most of the band members were fulfilling their mandatory military services. In late 2017, they released Play, their first self-produced album. They further released Time Slip (2019), Star (2021), a Japanese compilation album, The Renaissance (2021) and The Road: Winter for Spring (2022), their second single album.

Super Junior did not have any signature musical style, instead they had explore many genres in their long career. In 2018, they released "Lo Siento", a Latin-pop single featuring Leslie Grace which was sung in three language; Korean, Spanish and English. The song, a first of its kind, made them the first Korean artist to chart of Billboard Latin Digital Song Sales chart. The band had worked closedly with songwriter Yoo Young-jin who had written most of their Korean lead singles, notably the three title tracks known collectively as "SJ Funky" songs, "Sorry, Sorry" (2009), "Bonamana" (2010) and "Mr. Simple" (2011). The songs are considered as flagships K-pop songs, and has been covered by numerous artists. Super Junior had worked with many other songwriters such as Kenzie, Zico, Teddy Riley and One Way. They had also participate in writing some of their own songs.

Songs included in this list are from their studio albums, compilation albums, extended plays, single albums, live albums, and collaboration with other recording artists. Many of them were released as singles and have been successful both in South Korea and in international markets. Also included in this list are songs that were registered under their name in Korea Music Copyright Association (KOMCA) but were never officially released. This list is also inclusive of solo work released as tracks in the band's album.

Released songs

Live recordings

Unreleased songs

Notes

References

Super Junior